Revaz Injgia (born 31 December 2000) is a Georgian professional footballer who plays as a centre-forward for Cypriot First Division club Doxa Katokopias.

Honours
Apollon Limassol
 Cypriot First Division: 2021–22

References

External links
 

2000 births
Living people
Footballers from Tbilisi
Footballers from Georgia (country)
Association football forwards
FC Locomotive Tbilisi players
FK Radnički Sremska Mitrovica players
FC Telavi players
Apollon Limassol FC players
Erovnuli Liga players
Cypriot First Division players
Expatriate footballers from Georgia (country)
Expatriate sportspeople from Georgia (country) in Serbia
Expatriate sportspeople from Georgia (country) in Cyprus
Expatriate footballers in Serbia
Expatriate footballers in Cyprus